The Chapayev class (Project 68 Чапаев) were a group of cruisers built for the Soviet Navy during and after World War II. Seventeen ships were planned but only seven were actually started before the German invasion. Two incomplete ships were destroyed when their building yard in Nikolaev was captured by Nazi Germany and the remaining five cruisers were completed only in 1950.

Design

According to the needs of Stalin's "Big Fleet Programme" of 26 June 1936, number of light cruisers had to be built over the next 10 years. At first, more ships of Project 26 Kirov-class cruiser were planned but their armor and AA artillery was considered inadequate. To solve this problem, in August 1936 requirements were made for new Project 28 cruiser design. Similar to Kirov-class cruiser they were to form backbone of light forces flotillas but additional duties were added to its tasks as offensive minelaying, operations against enemy shipping and defence of own battleships against enemy light forces. Requirements were changed by the navy on 29 October 1937 for a ship armed with 3 triple 152mm (6.0 in) guns and designation of the class changed to Project 68 at the same time. But in March 1938, number of main guns were increased to 4 triple 152mm (6.0 in) again.

The rate of fire was 6 to 7 rounds per minute. The guns were mounted in individual cradles with separate elevation.

The secondary armament consisted of  CM-5 guns in twin enclosed powered turrets with a rate of fire of 15-18 rounds per minute. The light anti-aircraft guns consisted of  weapons.

The hull was enlarged, and protection was improved compared to the Kirov class. The machinery was based on a unit system with alternating boiler rooms and engine rooms.

The five ships were completed after the war to a modified design (Project 69K). The aircraft facilities and torpedo tubes were removed and radar and improved anti-aircraft artillery added (37 mm guns in twin powered and water cooled mountings).

Ships

A large programme was envisaged and seventeen ships were authorised in 1939 and eleven ordered. Six ships were to be built for the Baltic Fleet, four for the Black Sea Fleet and one for the Pacific Fleet. Seven ships were actually laid down before the German invasion in 1941.
 
Chapayev (Чапаев)
Named after Vasily Chapayev,  
Built by Ordzhinikidze Yard (Shipyard 189) Leningrad, 
Laid down 8 October 1939, 
Launched 28 April 1941, 
Completed 16 May 1950, 
Decommissioned 29 October 1960 
Zheleznyakov (Железняков) 
Named after Anatoly Zheleznyakov (1895-1919) a Bolshevik,
Built by Admiralty Shipyard (Shipyard 194) Leningrad, 
Laid down 31 October 1939, 
Launched 25 June 1941, 
Completed 19 April 1950, 
Decommissioned 1976
Kuybyshev (Куйбышев)  
Named after Valerian Kuybyshev,
Built by Marti Yard (Shipyard 200) Nikolayev,
Laid down 31 August 1939, 
Launched 31 January 1941, evacuated to Poti, Georgia
Completed 22 December 1950, 
Decommissioned 1965
Chkalov (Чкалов) - later renamed Komsomolets,
Originally named after Valery Chkalov,
Built by Ordzhinikidze Yard Leningrad, 
Laid down 31 August 1939, 
Launched 25 October 1947, 
Completed 1 November 1950, 
Decommissioned 1981
Frunze (Фрунзе) - 
Named after Mikhail Frunze,
Built by Marti Yard Nikolayev,
Laid down 29 August 1939, 
Launched 31 December 1940, evacuated to Poti, Georgia; stern used to repair damaged cruiser Molotov, 
Completed 15 December 1950, 
Decommissioned 1960

Two more ships, Ordzhinikidze and Sverdlov, were scrapped on the slipway after being captured by the Germans in Nikolayev during World War II.

Four other ships planned to be laid down in 1941 had planned names as Lenin, Dzerzhinsky, Avrora, Lazo but they weren't laid down  because of the World War II.

Four other ships planned to be laid down during 1942-1943 had planned names as Parkhomenko, Kotovsky, Shchors, Shcherbakov but all were canceled in 1941

References

Bibliography

External links

Cruiser "Frunze" from Black Sea Fleet (in Russian, with photos)
Cruiser "Kuybishev" from Black Sea Fleet (in Russian, with photos)
 Article in Russian language - http://ship.bsu.by/main.asp?id=102259
  All Russian Chapayev Class Cruisers - Complete Ship List

Cruiser classes